Zain Verjee (born February 11, 1974) is a Kenyan-born journalist of Indian descent based in Nairobi and the Los Angeles area. She is a former CNN anchor and correspondent.

Education
Verjee was born in Kenya and attended Hillcrest Prep School and Hillcrest Secondary School in Nairobi. She later received her undergraduate degree in English from McGill University in Montreal. She graduated from Oxford University with a Masters of Studies degree in Creative Writing.

Career

Journalism 
Verjee first worked as a radio DJ for 98.4 Capital FM. She became more interested in journalism after her involvement with reporting the 1998 bombing of the US embassy in Nairobi, which was close to the radio station. She became a news reader on Kenya Television Network shortly afterward, as well as doing some work for the BBC.

Verjee joined CNN in 2000. As the State Department correspondent covering Condoleezza Rice, Verjee travelled the world covering US foreign policy. Among her journeys, she covered the trip Rice took to Libya, and eventually was a lead reporter covering the fall of Muammar Gaddafi.

In July 2006, she reported from the Korean DMZ, winning an award for the coverage.  In September 2006, she conducted an interview with former Iranian president Mohammad Khatami on his first visit to Chicago.

While reporting on protests following Kenya's national elections in 2008, Verjee was hit by a tear gas canister shot by police.

Verjee was the anchor of CNN International's European daytime program World One. She worked as a newsreader for The Situation Room and as a co-anchor of CNN International's Your World Today with Jim Clancy.

In April 2014, Verjee announced she was leaving CNN after 14 years to create her own media production company.

Zain Verjee Group 
Zain Verjee Group is based in New York and Nairobi with a focus on African businesses and lifestyle stories. They have worked with Bloomberg Media, Bloomberg Philanthropies, Equity Group Foundation of Kenya, World Health Organization, The MiSK Foundation, and the United Nations Economic Commission for Africa on their public relations.

Entrepreneurship 
Verjee co-founded aKoma Media, a continental network of workspaces for Africa's creative and cultural economy, in 2015. The company shut down in 2019 due to financial hardships.

Her other ventures include Amplify, a content creator fellowship with participants from East/West Africa and the US, in partnership with MasterCard Foundation.

Personal life
Verjee is an Ismaili Muslim, a minority group in the Shia sect of Islam. When she was 23, she published a children's book, Live & On the Air.  It explores experiences of a young girl who moves from rural Kenya to Nairobi to work as a broadcaster.

In January 2014, Verjee reported that she had struggled with psoriasis since her childhood and though it affected the way she related with others, she won the battle against the disease through eating well and maintaining a good mental attitude.

References

External links

Zain Verjee Group Official Website

Zain Verjee, anchor CNN International
Daily Nation profile, May 20, 2001.
Short profile on SAJAforum.org

1974 births
Living people
Canadian Ismailis
McGill University alumni
Writers from Nairobi
Kenyan emigrants to Canada
Canadian people of Indian descent
Gujarati people
CNN people
Canadian television news anchors
Indian Muslims
Canadian women television journalists
Khoja Ismailism